Concept formation is the basis for inductive thinking model. It requires presentation of examples. Concept formation is the process of sorting out given examples into meaningful classes. In inductive thinking model students group examples together on some basis and form as many groups as they can, each group illustrating a different concept.

References

Learning